The 1948 All-Ireland Senior Camogie Championship was the high point of the 1948 season in Camogie. The championship was won by Dublin, who defeated Down by a 23-point margin in the final. It marked the return of Dublin to the roll of honour after an eight-year hiatus when it was separated from the rest of the camogie playing community, as the CIÉ club, which could call on the two greatest players of the era Kathleen Cody and Kathleen Mills, chose to affiliate to Central Council and their one-club selection won the All-Ireland championship.

Structure
Reigning champions Antrim were favourites to meet Dublin in the All Ireland final. Instead Down shocked Derry 4–5 to 1–0 at Kilclief.

Final
The All-Ireland final between Dublin and Down was played on a Saturday for the first time.

Final stages

 
 Match Rules
50 minutes
Replay if scores level
Maximum of 3 substitutions

See also
 All-Ireland Senior Hurling Championship
 Wikipedia List of Camogie players
 National Camogie League
 Camogie All Stars Awards
 Ashbourne Cup

References

External links
 Camogie Association
 Historical reports of All Ireland finals
 All-Ireland Senior Camogie Championship: Roll of Honour
 Camogie on facebook
 Camogie on GAA Oral History Project

1948 in camogie
1948